The 30th women's Giro d'Italia, or Giro Rosa, was held from 5 to 14 July 2019. Raced over ten stages, it was considered the most prestigious stage race of the women's calendar. The defending champion, Annemiek van Vleuten, won the race.

Teams
Twenty-four teams of up to six riders each took part in the race:

UCI Women's WorldTeams

Route
The race consisted of 10 stages totalling , beginning in Cassano Spinola on 5 July with a team time trial and finishing in Udine on 14 July. Though originally  in length, landslides forced the route of stage 5 to be rerouted.

Stages

Stage 1
5 July 2019 — Cassano Spinola to Castellania, team time trial (TTT)

Stage 2
6 July 2019 — Viù to Viù,

Stage 3
7 July 2019 — Sagliano Micca to Piedicavallo, 

She quickly opened up a gap and managed to keep it up the steep drag to the finish line. At 200 meter to go, the bunch was closing in and Marianne Vos launched her attack. Unaware of this, and with only a few meters left to the finish line, Kennedy thought she had won and started raising her arm in celebration. In extremis, Vos sped passed her to the stage victory, leaving Kennedy with second place.

Stage 4
8 July 2019 — Lissone to Carate Brianza, 

A three rider strong breakaway, consisting of Letizia Borghesi, Chiara Perini and Anouska Koster rode away from the peloton after . Koster was dropped, while Nadia Quagliotto attacked from the peloton to join the two other Italians at the front. Quagliotto unsuccessfully tried to drop her fellow breakaway companions on the only categorised climb of the day. With the race coming down to a sprint for the three riders in the breakaway, Quagliotto was the first to launch her sprint. Thinking she'd won, she started celebrating, only to be pipped on the line by Borghesi.

Stage 5
9 July 2019 — Ponte in Valtellina to Valfurva (Passo Gavia) Lago di Cancano,  

Originally, stage 5 was planned to finish on the Passo di Gavia. However, due to landslides, the stage had to be rerouted. The organisers replaced the Gavia with the finish to Lago Cancano in Valdidentro, a finish previously used in the 2011 edition.

Stage 6
10 July 2019 — Chiuro to Teglio,

Stage 7
11 July 2019 — Cornedo Vicentino to San Giorgio di Perlena/Fara Vicentino,

Stage 8
12 July 2019 — Vittorio Veneto to Maniago,

Stage 9
13 July 2019 — Gemona to Chiusaforte/Malga Montasio,

Stage 10
14 July 2019 — San Vito al Tagliamento to Udine,

Classification leadership table

In the 2019 Giro d'Italia Femminile, five different jerseys will be awarded. The most important is the general classification, which is calculated by adding each cyclist's finishing times on each stage. Time bonuses will be awarded to the first three finishers on all stages with the exception of the time trials: the stage winner will win a ten-second bonus, with six and four seconds for the second and third riders respectively. Bonus seconds will also be awarded to the first three riders at intermediate sprints; three seconds for the winner of the sprint, two seconds for the rider in second and one second for the rider in third. The rider with the least accumulated time is the race leader, identified by a pink jersey. This classification is considered the most important of the 2019 Giro d'Italia Femminile, and the winner of the classification was considered the winner of the race.

Additionally, there will a points classification, which awards a cyclamen jersey. In the points classification, cyclists receive points for finishing in the top 10 in a stage, and unlike in the points classification in the Tour de France, the winners of all stages – with the exception of the team time trial, which awards no points towards the classification – are awarded the same number of points. For winning a stage, a rider earned 15 points, with 12 for second, 10 for third, 8 for fourth, 6 for fifth with a point fewer per place down to a single point for 10th place.

There is also a mountains classification, the leadership of which is marked by a green jersey. In the mountains classification, points towards the classification are won by reaching the top of a climb before other cyclists. Each climb is categorised as either second, or third-category, with more points available for the higher-categorised climbs; however on both categories, the top five riders were awarded points. The fourth jersey represents the young rider classification, marked by a white jersey. This is decided the same way as the general classification, but only riders born on or after 1 January 1996 are eligible to be ranked in the classification.

The fifth and final jersey represents the classification for Italian riders, marked by a blue jersey. This is decided the same way as the general classification, but only riders born in Italy are eligible to be ranked in the classification. There is also a team classification, in which the times of the best three cyclists per team on each stage are added together; the leading team at the end of the race is the team with the lowest total time. The daily team leaders wore red dossards in the following stage.

Final classification standings

General classification

Points classification

Mountains classification

Young rider classification

Italian rider classification

Teams classification

See also
 2019 in women's road cycling

Notes

External links

References

2019 UCI Women's World Tour
2019
2019 in Italian sport
Giro Rosa